Gonikoppal is a census town in the Kodagu district of the Indian state of Karnataka.

Demographics
According to 2011 census,Gonikoppal had a population of 8,306. Males constitute 52% of the population and females 48%. Gonikoppal has an average literacy rate of 78%, higher than the national average of 59.5%: male literacy is 83%, and female literacy is 73%. In Gonikoppal, 13% of the population is under 6 years of age.

Gonikoppal is in Ponnampet taluk and is also the commercial hub of Kodagu district due to its proximity to Mysore District and the neighboring Kerala state.

Gonikoppal is the fastest developing town in Kodagu, after Kushalnagar.

Tourist attractions

 Pakshi Pathalam is a hillock near Kutta which can be reached by trekking seven kilometers from Thirunelli temple.  There is a cave on the hillock with many bird species. 
 Kutta is known for its peaceful atmosphere and so a large number of homestays and resorts are located here. Irupu Falls in the jungles is a short drive from Kutta. Also the road from Kutta winds its way to Kabini backwaters and HD Kote.
 Tea Estate near T.Shettigere village, on the way to Shri Mrutyunjaya Swamy temple.
 White water rafting in Barapole river. 
 Less known Sharadabi waterfalls, Kunda betta, Brahmagiri Wildlife Sanctuary.
 Shri Mrutyunjaya Swamy temple in Baadagarakeri. It is the only temple in South India dedicated to Lord Mrutyunjaya.

Educational Organizations
 Cauvery college
 Lions School
 Lions High School, Kalathmad
 St. Thomas School
 Karaumbiah's Academy for Learning & Sports (KALS) 
 Coorg Public School
 National Academy School
 Vidyaniketan PU College

Transportation
Karnataka State Highway 89 and 90 pass through this town. The town is well connected to Mysuru, Bengaluru and its district headquarters Madikeri. Private buses connects the town with all the other towns in Kodagu district. Karnataka State Road Transport Corporation buses connect Gonikoppal to metropolitan cities like Bengaluru, Kochi, Mysuru, and other cities like Mangaluru, Kannur, Kozhikode, Kalpetta, Hassan and Chikmagaluru. There is no railway station in Gonikoppal. Nearest railway station is Mysuru Junction railway station at 90km. Nearest airport is Kannur International Airport at 70km.

Suburbs and Villages
 Kutta, Poojekkal, Manchalli and Hudkeri, T Shettigeri, Srimangala, Birunani
 Begur, Ponnampet and Aruvathoklu
 Chikpet, Kabbinakkad and Kabbinakkad
 Kallur, Choorikkad and Machaan
 Kallali, Devarajacolony and Panchavalli
 Kokkarehosalli, Muddenahalli and Thithimathi
 Kothur, Besgur, Bekesodlur, Kanoor, Nadikeri.

See also 
 Madikeri
 Virajpet
 Ponnampet
 Kutta
 Suntikoppa
 Napoklu
 Kushalanagar
 Somwarpet
 Kaikeri

References

External links 
https://kodagu.nic.in/en/public-utility/gonikoppal-lsg/

Cities and towns in Kodagu district